Marlboro Township is one of the seventeen townships of Stark County, Ohio, United States.  The 2000 census found 4,227 people in the township.

Geography
Located in the northern part of the county, it borders the following townships:
Randolph Township, Portage County - north
Atwater Township, Portage County - northeast
Lexington Township - east
Washington Township - southeast
Nimishillen Township - south
Plain Township - southwest corner
Lake Township - west

No municipalities are located in Marlboro Township, although the unincorporated community of Marlboro is located in the township's east.

Name and history
Statewide, the only other Marlboro Township is located in Delaware County.

Marlboro Township was historically also spelled Marlborough. In 1833, Marlborough Township contained three stores, one tannery, and four saw mills.

References

External links
County website

Townships in Stark County, Ohio
Townships in Ohio